Olthuis is a Dutch surname. Notable people with the surname include:

James Olthuis, philosopher
Koen Olthuis, architect and designer of the Amphibious House
Marja-Liisa Olthuis (born 1967), Inari Sámi researcher, author and language activist

Dutch-language surnames